White County Asylum, also known as the Lakeview Home, was a historic county home located at Union Township, White County, Indiana. The main building was built in 1907–1908, and was a large four-level, Richardsonian Romanesque style brick building with limestone and brick trim.  It consisted of a central administrative section flanked by residential wings.  The building featured a high hipped roof.  Also on the property is a contributing gable roofed barn (1908).  The property is a contributing site.

It was listed on the National Register of Historic Places in 2010. The building was demolished in 2017, and it was delisted in 2019.

References

Government buildings on the National Register of Historic Places in Indiana
Richardsonian Romanesque architecture in Indiana
Government buildings completed in 1908
Buildings and structures in White County, Indiana
National Register of Historic Places in White County, Indiana
1908 establishments in Indiana
Former National Register of Historic Places in Indiana
Demolished buildings and structures in Indiana
Buildings and structures demolished in 2017